Sheepskin Run is a  long 1st order tributary to the Youghiogheny River in Fayette County, Pennsylvania.

Course
Sheepskin Run rises about 1 mile northeast of Ohiopyle, Pennsylvania, and then flows southwest to join the Youghiogheny River about 0.25 miles east of Ohiopyle.

Watershed
Sheepskin Run drains  of area, receives about 47.3 in/year of precipitation, has a wetness index of 332.00, and is about 94% forested.

See also
List of rivers of Pennsylvania

References

Tributaries of the Youghiogheny River
Rivers of Pennsylvania
Rivers of Fayette County, Pennsylvania